O Fósforo Eleitoral (The Election Match) is an early silent Brazilian film, released in 1909. A short comedy film, it was directed by Antonio Serra and released on November 2, 1909. It was shot in Rio de Janeiro, and produced by the company Labanca, Leal e Cia., in partnership with the Photo-Cinematographia Brasileira.

According to a review published by the Jornal do Brasil at the time of release, the film offered a witty but severe criticism of elections in Rio de Janeiro.

Cast
Adelaide Coutinho
Eduardo Leite
Emílio Silva

References

External links
 

1909 comedy films
1909 films
Brazilian silent short films
Brazilian satirical films
Films shot in Rio de Janeiro (city)
Brazilian political satire films
1909 short films
Comedy short films
Brazilian black-and-white films
Brazilian comedy films
Silent comedy films